Faig Jabbarov (26 June 1972) is an Azerbaijani footballer.

Honours

Individual
Azerbaijani Footballer of the Year (1): 1997

External links
 

1972 births
Living people
Sportspeople from Ganja, Azerbaijan
FK Shamkir players
Kapaz PFK players
Soviet footballers
Azerbaijani footballers
Azerbaijan international footballers
Association football defenders
Neftçi PFK players